The dharkar are a Hindu caste found in the state of Uttar Pradesh, India.

Origin
The word dharkar comes from the Hindi words dhar, meaning rope, and kar, meaning manufacturer. This denotes their traditional occupation of rope-making. The Dharkar are found mainly in purvanchal district. A small number are also found in the districts of Gazipur, Azamgarh, Allahabad, Gonda and Gorakhpur. They speak the Awadhi dialect of Hindi.

References

Scheduled Castes of Uttar Pradesh